The 1985 African Women's Handball Championship was the sixth edition of the African Women's Handball Championship, held in Angola.

Preliminary rounds

Group A

Group B

Final round
All times are local (UTC+1).

Consolation matches

Bracket

Semifinals

3rd place

Final

Final ranking

External links
Results on todor66.com

1985 Women
African Women's Handball Championship
African Women's Handball Championship
1985 in Angola
1985 in African handball
Women's handball in Angola
1985 in African women's sport